Dominik Radić (born 26 July 1996) is a Croatian professional footballer who plays as a forward for Bosnian side NK Široki Brijeg.

Club career

ŠKF Sereď
Radić made his Fortuna Liga debut for Sereď against Žilina on 25 July 2021.

References

External links
 
 ŠKF Sereď official club profile 
 
 Futbalnet profile 

1996 births
Living people
Footballers from Hanover
Association football forwards
Croatian footballers
NK Inter Zaprešić players
NK Slaven Belupo players
NK Rudar Velenje players
SK Sigma Olomouc players
ŠKF Sereď players
NK Široki Brijeg players
Slovenian PrvaLiga players
Croatian Football League players
First Football League (Croatia) players
Czech First League players
Slovak Super Liga players
Premier League of Bosnia and Herzegovina players
Croatian expatriate footballers
Expatriate footballers in Slovenia
Croatian expatriate sportspeople in Slovenia
Expatriate footballers in the Czech Republic
Croatian expatriate sportspeople in the Czech Republic
Expatriate footballers in Slovakia
Croatian expatriate sportspeople in Slovakia
Expatriate footballers in Bosnia and Herzegovina
Croatian expatriate sportspeople in Bosnia and Herzegovina